Chasin' the Bird may refer to:

 "Chasin' the Bird" (song), a Charlie Parker composition
 Chasin' the Bird (Miles Davis album), 2000
 Chasin' the Bird (Barry Harris album), 1962